Archaeopsylla is a genus of fleas, containing one known species, the hedgehog flea, A. erinacei.

References 

Pulicidae
Monotypic insect genera
Siphonaptera genera
Parasitic arthropods of mammals